The 2019 UEFA Women's Champions League Final was the final match of the 2018–19 UEFA Women's Champions League, the 18th season of Europe's premier women's club football tournament organised by UEFA, and the 10th season since it was renamed from the UEFA Women's Cup to the UEFA Women's Champions League. This was the first time since the final is played as a single match that a host city for the Women's Champions League final was not automatically assigned by which city won the bid to host the men's Champions League final, although the same association is still allowed to host both finals by the UEFA bid regulations. It was played at the Groupama Arena in Budapest, Hungary on 18 May 2019, between French side Lyon and Spanish side Barcelona.

Lyon won the final 4–1 for their fourth consecutive and sixth overall UEFA Women's Champions League title.

Teams
In the following table, finals until 2009 were in the UEFA Women's Cup era, since 2010 were in the UEFA Women's Champions League era.

Lyon, which hold the record for most titles (five) and most consecutive titles (three), are the first team to reach eight finals and four consecutive finals. Barcelona were the first Spanish team to reach the final, and the first women's side whose men's team have also won the Champions League.

Venue

This is the first time a major international women's final is held in Hungary.

The stadium is the home ground of Hungarian club Ferencváros. Due to UEFA regulations regarding naming rights of non-tournament sponsors, the stadium was referred to as the "Ferencváros Stadium" in all UEFA materials.

Host selection
For the first time ever, an open bidding process was launched on 9 December 2016 by UEFA to select the venues of the club competition finals (UEFA Champions League, UEFA Europa League, UEFA Women's Champions League, and UEFA Super Cup). Associations had until 27 January 2017 to express interest, and bid dossiers must be submitted by 6 June 2017.

UEFA announced on 3 February 2017 that six associations expressed interest in hosting, and confirmed on 7 June 2017 that two associations submitted bids for the 2019 UEFA Women's Champions League Final:

The following associations expressed interest in hosting but eventually did not submit bids:
Czech Republic: Eden Arena, Prague
Lithuania: Darius and Girėnas Stadium, Kaunas
Scotland: Hampden Park, Glasgow
Spain: Coliseum Alfonso Pérez, Getafe

The bid evaluation report was published by UEFA on 14 September 2017. The Groupama Arena was selected as the venue by the UEFA Executive Committee on 20 September 2017.

Road to the final

Note: In all results below, the score of the finalist is given first (H: home; A: away).

Pre-match

Ticketing
Tickets were available for sale for 1,000 HUF, 700 HUF, and 500 HUF.

Match

Officials
On 1 May 2019, UEFA announced that Anastasia Pustovoitova of Russia would officiate the final. She was joined by Russian compatriot Ekaterina Kurochkina and Petruţa Iugulescu of Romania as assistant referees. The fourth official for the final was Hungarian Katalin Kulcsár, joined by fellow countrywoman Katalin Török as reserve official.

Details
The "home" team (for administrative purposes) was determined by an additional draw held after the quarter-final and semi-final draws, which was held on 9 November 2018, 13:00 CET, at the UEFA headquarters in Nyon, Switzerland.

Statistics

See also

2019 UEFA Champions League Final
2019 UEFA Europa League Final
2019 UEFA Super Cup

References

External links

2019 Women's Champions League final: Budapest, UEFA.com

2019
Final
May 2019 sports events in Europe
2019
International club association football competitions hosted by Hungary
2010s in Budapest
2018–19 in Hungarian football
Olympique Lyonnais Féminin matches
FC Barcelona Femení
Women's Champions League Final
Women's Champions League Final